Michael E. "Mike" Anti (born August 2, 1964) is an American sport shooter, a former Major in the U.S. Army, and a marksman in the U.S. Army World Class Athlete Program. He competed at the 1992, 2000, 2004 and 2008 Olympics in 50 m small-bore rifle events and won a silver medal in the three positions event in 2004. In 2009 he became assistant rifle coach at the United States Air Force Academy. In 2017 he became the head coach at the United States Naval Academy.

References

 Profile at Naval Academy Athletics
 Profile at West Virginia University Sports Hall of Fame

1964 births
Living people
American male sport shooters
United States Distinguished Marksman
ISSF rifle shooters
Shooters at the 2004 Summer Olympics
United States Army officers
American people of Finnish descent
Olympic silver medalists for the United States in shooting
Sportspeople from Orange, California
Medalists at the 2004 Summer Olympics
Pan American Games medalists in shooting
Air Force Falcons rifle coaches
Pan American Games gold medalists for the United States
Shooters at the 1991 Pan American Games
Medalists at the 1991 Pan American Games
Military personnel from California
U.S. Army World Class Athlete Program
West Virginia Mountaineers rifle shooters